The 2009 local elections were held in Split, Croatia on 17 and 31 May 2009.

The incumbent HDZ mayor Ivan Kuret  was running for a full four-year term after he was appointed mayor on 17 July 2007 after the former mayor Zvonimir Puljić was impeached by the city council.

Mayoral election

Council election

Split local
Split 2009
Split local
History of Split, Croatia